Agios Vasileios is a village and a municipality in Rethymno regional unit, Crete, Greece. The seat of the municipality is the village Spili.

Municipality
The municipality Agios Vasileios was formed at the 2011 local government reform by the merger of the following 2 former municipalities, that became municipal units:
Foinikas
Lampi

Province
The province of Agios Vasileios was one of the provinces of the Rethymno Prefecture. It had the same territory as the present municipality. It was abolished in 2006.

References

Populated places in Rethymno (regional unit)
Municipalities of Crete
Provinces of Greece